Guran (also Romanized as Gūrān; also known as Bandar-e Gūrān) is a village in Salakh Rural District, Shahab District, Qeshm County, Hormozgan Province, Iran. At the 2006 census, its population was 1,131, in 282 families.

References 

Populated places in Qeshm County